Alraune is a German science fiction Horror film directed by Richard Oswald. Like the 1928 version this movie again features Brigitte Helm in the role of Alraune. This version aimed for greater realism but is still based upon the original German myth.

Plot
A scientist, Professor Jakob ten Brinken, interested in the laws of heredity, impregnates a prostitute in a laboratory with the semen of a hanged murderer. The prostitute conceives a female child who has no concept of love, whom the professor adopts. The girl, Alraune, suffers from obsessive sexuality and perverse relationships throughout her life. She learns of her unnatural origins and she avenges herself against the professor.

Cast

Release
Alraune was first shown in Germany at the Gloria-Palast theatre on 2 December 1930.

Critical reception
From contemporary reviews, 
The New York Times described the film in 1934 as a "highly interesting production...Brigitte Helm, the versatile German actress, is the centre of the story...Her work is up to the high standard she has established in several foreign language pictures that have reached New York. Albert Bassermann, one of Germany's best veteran actors, is excellent as the scientist whose efforts to emulate the wonder-workers of the ancient days bring so much trouble upon nearly all involved in the affair, regardless of their innocence or guilt. The support is first class...Although this picture was made almost four years ago, the sound reproduction and photography are clear. The direction is competent." "Magnus." of Variety dismissed the film as being "very low level and involves a ghastly ideas by Hanns Heinz Ewers, the picture is bad and silly." Magnus. felt that actors Agnes Straub and Alebrt Bassermann were "not well handled in this instance" and that director Oswald "is so inferior in his direction that good actors are wasted."

References

External links 
 
 

1930 films
German black-and-white films
Films of the Weimar Republic
1930s German-language films
German science fiction horror films
Films directed by Richard Oswald
Films based on German novels
Films based on works by Hanns Heinz Ewers
Sound film remakes of silent films
Remakes of German films
Erotic fantasy films
UFA GmbH films
1930s science fiction horror films
Films produced by Erich Pommer
1930s German films